Charles William Sutton (1848–1920) was a British librarian and author.

Career
Sutton was librarian of the Free Manchester Public Libraries. He was also Secretary of the Chetham Society from 1890 to 1920, Editor of the Lancashire and Cheshire Antiquarian Society from 1885 to 1920 and also a Member of the Manchester Literary and Philosophical Society.

Writing
He was a contributor to the Dictionary of National Biography, creating many articles for the main work, and some for Supplement 1 and Supplement 2.

Legacy
The collection of his letters "1887–1908: letters to John Brownbill and other correspondence" are held by Manchester Archives and Local Studies.

His letter to Edward Arber is in the University of Birmingham: Cadbury Research Library: Special Collections.

Bibliography
 Ernest Axon Charles W. Sutton, M.A., Chief Librarian, Manchester Public Libraries, 1879–1920. An appreciation  With two portraits (1921)

References

External links

1848 births
1920 deaths
English librarians
English writers
Manchester Literary and Philosophical Society
Lancashire and Cheshire Antiquarian Society